Aq Zabir (also Romanized as Āq Zabīr and Eqzebīr; also known as Āq Zīr) is a village in Gorganbuy Rural District, in the Central District of Aqqala County, Golestan Province, Iran. At the 2006 census, its population was 789, in 173 families.

References 

Populated places in Aqqala County